Fernando Guimarães Kevanu (14 August 1936 – 18 May 2022) was an Angolan Roman Catholic bishop.  

Guimarães Kevanu was born in Angola. He was ordained to the priesthood in 1970. He was named bishop of the Roman Catholic Diocese of Ondjiva, Angola in 1988 and served until his retirement in 2011.

References

1936 births
2022 deaths
20th-century Roman Catholic bishops in Angola
21st-century Roman Catholic bishops in Angola
Bishops appointed by Pope John Paul II
People from Lubango